The Western Range may refer to:

 Various mountain ranges:
 California Coast Ranges in the United States
 Pacific Cordillera or Rocky Mountains of North America
 Western Range (Canada), another name for the Kootenay Ranges of the Canadian Rockies
 Western Range (Taiwan), a former name of the Xueshan Range
 Western Range (Tasmania), another name for the West Coast Range
 Western Range (USSF), a missile and launch range

See also

 West Range in Nevada, USA
 West Mountains in Idaho, USA
 Western Mountains or Western Hills in Beijing, China
 Jabal al Gharbi District, a region of Libya whose name means the "Western Mountains"
 
 
 Cordillera Occidental (disambiguation) aka "Western Range"
 Eastern Range (disambiguation)
 Western (disambiguation)
 Range (disambiguation)